Prince Aleksander Jan Jabłonowski (died 1723) was a Polish nobleman.

Aleksander became Great Chorąży of the Crown in 1693 and starost of Korsuń, Busk, Ukraine and Dzwinogród.

17th-century births
1723 deaths
Aleksander Jan
Members of the Sejm of the Polish–Lithuanian Commonwealth
Military personnel of the Polish–Lithuanian Commonwealth